DC Superheroes is a collection of action figures originally produced by Mattel in early 2006. It is divided into three different lines - the Justice League Unlimited toyline, with figures based on the animated Justice League Unlimited series; the S3: Select Sculpt Series, featuring more comic-accurate figures in the 6" scale; and a 12" figure line. The S3 line is further divided into two lines - one featuring Batman, and the other featuring Superman. Series 1 of the S3 line began shipping just after Christmas 2005 to Wal-Mart and began arriving in retailers like Target and Toys "R" Us approximately one month later. The figures have characteristics similar to the competing Marvel Legends line in terms of detailed sculpting, articulation, and including a comic book or diorama with each figure.

History
The line began as a successor to Mattel's Batman toyline. Since Mattel only had the license to Batman and Superman characters at the time (with the exception of the Justice League Unlimited line), only Batman and Superman characters were able to appear in the line. Instead of primarily using variations on a single character, the line focused on secondary characters and villains.

At New York City's Toy Fair in 2006, the first five assortments were announced (though the fourth series was postponed). The entire line (with the exception of Robin and Nightwing) was sculpted by the Four Horsemen Studios. The figures have around twenty one points of articulation and initially came with a comic book centering on the character it came with, but in 2007 figures came with cardboard dioramas instead.

On June 28, 2007 Mattel's license was extended to include all of the DC Comics characters, including all movies and TV shows past, present and future. At San Diego Comic-Con International, Mattel announced they would be re-branding the line into DC Universe Classics. The first series was viewable at SDCC 2007 and was released in January 2008.

Justice League Unlimited

Around the same time the first S3 figures hit shelves, the JLU line had also moved under the brand "DC Superheroes". The packaging is similar to the S3 line: in 2006 they were both orange; in 2007, they both became purple.

S3 - Select Sculpt Series Figures

The S3 line featured only Superman and Batman characters, and although the promise was that the line would focus on villains and secondary characters, in practice the assortments were heavy with variations of the main characters. Early series of figures came with comic books featuring the character they came with, yet due to shipping costs and complications (Mattel is near the West Coast, DC Comics is on the East Coast), Mattel later switched to cardboard dioramas.

In the past Mattel had expressed interest in trying to make almost every character in the DC Universe. Mattel also said they would continue their Batman and Superman lines, but within the continued DC Universe Classics brand. Characters they expressed interest in, and planned on making in the Batman series were: Poison Ivy, Harley Quinn, a Batman Begins Scarecrow, Ra's al Ghul, Firefly, The Riddler, Talia al Ghul, Mad Hatter, and Black Mask (Harley Quinn and the Riddler were eventually released as part of DC Universe Classics, while Scarecrow was released as part of the Movie Masters line).

Series One (Batman)
The last series of Mattel's Batman toyline, featuring several new characters, was not released in America; instead, it reached distant areas such as Australia. Three out of four figures (Bat Signal Batman, Bane, and Scarecrow) were retooled (Batman had new paint and a new cape, and a running change on Bane gave him new hands), and shipped to Wal-Marts. The fourth figure of the assortment was Killer Croc, who was previously hard to find and had a new head sculpt and paint application. The only Batman figure that was initially shipped overseas and never re-shipped under the DC Superheroes line was Attack Armor Batman.

Series Two (Superman)
Series Two featured Superman, Supergirl, Doomsday, Bizarro, and a Superman/Bizarro 2-pack (released exclusively to Target).

Series Three (Batman)

With Series Three, the S3 line returned to the Batman family, releasing a new Batman, Robin, Azrael, and Mr. Freeze. While Robin and Mr. Freeze shared the same sculpt as their original releases in the Batman toyline, Batman and Azrael were new sculpts released for the first time, though Mr. Freeze featured as much articulation as Batman and Azrael. Series Three was also the first series to include a diorama with each figure instead of a comic book. Although comics would be included again with Series 4 figures, Series Five through Eight would feature dioramas only.

Series Four (Superman)
The second Superman series (fourth series overall) featured Superman (black "S" shield), Lex Luthor, Brainiac, and Darkseid. Two Target-exclusive two-packs were also released, one featuring Superman/Clark Kent, and one featuring Batman/Batgirl (comic-styled Barbara Gordon version).

Series Five (Superman)
This series marks the departure from orange cards to the new purple packs. Sticking with Superman for the next two series, Mattel released Steel, Parasite, Kal-El, Black Suit Superman, and Cyborg Superman (very hard to find) figures, along with repainted versions of Superman, Supergirl, Doomsday, Bizarro, and Darkseid.

Series Six (Superman)

Series Seven (Batman)
A brown version of Man-Bat was originally scheduled for Series Seven, but was dropped. The figure was eventually released as part of DC Universe Classics. A dark tech-suit variant of Mr. Freeze was also to be included but was dropped as well; it was eventually released as a convention exclusive in 2008.

Series Eight (Batman)
Half of this series featured repaints from the Batman toyline.

Target Exclusive 2-packs
The orange-carded DC Superheroes S3 series packs were rounded out by 2-packs exclusively released to Target stores.

Toys "R" Us Exclusives
The following figures are repaints of figures in the DC Superheroes line and were included in Toys "R" Us exclusives.

Ultimate Batman 5-pack

Batman/Robin 2-packs
A Batman/Nightwing 2-pack was also advertised but was apparently never released.

Convention exclusives
These figures were offered as exclusives during comic conventions in 2007 and 2008.

12" figures
Mattel also released several 12" figures under the DC Superheroes banner. The figures are larger versions of the S3 sculpts. This line continued as part of the DC Universe line.

See also
DC Direct

External links
DC Superheroes checklist
DC Superheroes Image Archive
DC Superheroes @ BatmanYTB.com

DC Comics action figure lines
Mattel
2000s toys